5'-Guanidinonaltrindole (5'-GNTI) is an opioid antagonist used in scientific research which is highly selective for the κ opioid receptor. It is 5x more potent and 500 times more selective than the commonly used κ-opioid antagonist norbinaltorphimine. It has a slow onset and long duration of action, and produces antidepressant effects in animal studies. It also increases allodynia by interfering with the action of the κ-opioid peptide dynorphin.

In addition to activity at the KOR, 5'-GNTI has been found to act as a positive allosteric modulator of the α1A-adrenergic receptor (EC50 = 41 nM), and this may contribute to its "severe transient effects".

See also 
 6'-Guanidinonaltrindole
 Binaltorphimine
 JDTic

References 

Alpha-1 adrenergic receptor agonists
Guanidines
Indolomorphinans
Irreversible antagonists
Kappa-opioid receptor antagonists
Phenols
Semisynthetic opioids
Tertiary alcohols